Are You a Mason? is a 1934 British comedy film directed by Henry Edwards and starring Sonnie Hale, Robertson Hare, Davy Burnaby and Gwyneth Lloyd. It was made at Twickenham Studios.

Premise
Two men pretend to be freemasons to impress each other.

Cast
 Sonnie Hale as Frank Perry
 Robertson Hare as Amos Bloodqood
 Davy Burnaby as John Halton
 Gwyneth Lloyd as Eva
 Bertha Belmore as Mrs Bloodgood
 Joyce Kirby as Lulu
 Lewis Shaw as George Fisher
 Michael Shepley as Emest Monison
 Davina Craig as Annie
 May Agate as Mrs Halton

References

External links
 

1934 films
1934 comedy films
British comedy films
British black-and-white films
Films directed by Henry Edwards
1930s English-language films
1930s British films